Herbert Steffny (born 5 September 1953 in Trier) is a former German long distance track event runner and prominent physical trainer.

Professional career
After modest successes as a youngster in long distance running, Steffny gave up the competitive running while studying biology, and returned to competition in the older than 30 category.

His first victory came at the Echternach Marathon in 1983, and in the following year he would place third in the New York City Marathon.

Steffny was the German champion in the 1985 marathon run, 1987 German champion in 10,000 meter run and 1989 German Champion in cross country.  In addition came the title in the 25 kilometer road running and fell running. He won the Eurocross competition in Luxembourg in 1988.

He was the first West German marathon runner to hold a medal in a major international event, as he placed 3rd in the 1986 European Championships in Athletics in Stuttgart Germany with a time of 2:11:30.

He competed for Post-Jahn Freiburg.  In his active career (officially particularly from the 80's), he was 1.79 meters tall and weighed 67 kg.

Achievements
All results regarding marathon, unless stated otherwise

Boston Marathon: 1996 Winner of the Age Class Championship (over 40)

Personal life
Herbert Steffny has a degree in biology and became a running trainer after his sports career.  Since 1998, he has published numerous books (among others the German best seller Das große Laufbuch) about running.

He has been a business leader of a company for running seminars, training and trips in the Titisee-Neustadt in the Black Forest. He looked after the former Federal Foreign Minister Joschka Fischer by his marathon training.

Steffny works as a co-commentator for ARD television and presents the live feed in the city marathons of Berlin, Frankfurt, Cologne and Mainz.

Also his older brother, the  editor Manfred Steffny, was also a successful marathon runner.

References

External links
Works of and by Herbert Steffny from the German National Library 
Website of Herbert Steffny 

1956 births
Living people
German male long-distance runners
German male marathon runners
Sportspeople from Trier
European Athletics Championships medalists
Frankfurt Marathon male winners
20th-century German people